The 2021 New Jersey gubernatorial election was held on November 2, 2021, to elect the governor of New Jersey.

The Democratic incumbent, Governor Phil Murphy, who was first elected in 2017 with 56% of the vote, ran for and won re-election to a second term. He formally announced his intention to run for a second term on October 1, 2020. Primaries were held on June 8, 2021. Murphy, who won the Democratic nomination unopposed after his two primary challengers were disqualified, faced Republican nominee Jack Ciattarelli, Green nominee Madelyn Hoffman, Libertarian nominee Gregg Mele, and Socialist Workers Party nominee Joanne Kuniansky in the general election.

The race was considered by many media outlets to be a "safe" or "likely" Democratic hold, as Murphy had led a majority of pre-election polls by double digits. However, Murphy defeated Ciattarelli by a much smaller margin than expected. Murphy is the first Democratic governor of New Jersey to win re-election since Brendan Byrne in 1977, as well as the first candidate of the same party as the incumbent U.S. president to win since Thomas Kean in 1985. This is also the first New Jersey gubernatorial election since 2009 where both the Democratic and Republican nominees received more than one million votes each. Ciatterelli received the most votes out of any non governor-elect in a New Jersey gubernatorial election, and Murphy got the most votes for a New Jersey governor since 1989.

It also was the first New Jersey gubernatorial election where the Green Party candidate placed third. Murphy also became the first Democrat to win a New Jersey gubernatorial election without carrying Gloucester and Cumberland Counties since Robert B. Meyner in 1953, and the first Democrat to win a gubernatorial election without carrying Atlantic County since Richard J. Hughes in 1961. Also, this was the first New Jersey gubernatorial election in which Somerset County voted more Democratic than the state as a whole since 1910. Murphy became the first New Jersey Governor since Brendan Bryne to win both of his elections with a majority of the vote each time. It was the first single-digit Democratic win in a governor's election since 1961. 

During the election, several technical problems with internet connections were reported across the state after newly installed voting machines were used for the first time, resulting in machine malfunctions that were eventually resolved. This caused a delay in the final results. With 98% of the vote tallied, Ciattarelli conceded to Governor Phil Murphy at a news conference on November 12, 2021, and announced that he would run again in 2025.

Democratic primary

Candidates

Nominee
 Phil Murphy, incumbent governor (2018–present)

Disqualified
 Roger Bacon, perennial candidate
 Lisa McCormick, candidate for U.S. Senate in 2018

Declined
 Jamel Holley, state assemblyman from the 20th district (ran for State Senate)
 Stephen M. Sweeney, President of the New Jersey Senate (running for re-election)

Fundraising

Results

Republican primary

Candidates

Nominee
 Jack Ciattarelli, former member of the New Jersey General Assembly from the 16th district (2011–2018) and candidate for governor in 2017

Eliminated in primary
 Brian Levine, former Somerset County commissioner (2014–2020), former mayor of Franklin Township, Somerset County (2004–2014) and candidate for governor in 2009
 Phil Rizzo, pastor
 Hirsh Singh, businessman, engineer, and perennial candidate

Withdrew
 Joseph Rudy Rullo, businessman, actor and perennial candidate (endorsed Hirsh Singh)
 Doug Steinhardt, chairman of the Warren County Republican Committee (2004–present), former mayor of Lopatcong (1999–2014) and former Chairman of the New Jersey Republican State Committee (2017–2020)
 Joseph Vicari, Ocean County commissioner

Declined
 Jon Bramnick, minority leader of the New Jersey General Assembly (running for State Senate)
 Chris Christie, former Governor of New Jersey (2010–2018)
 Joe Kyrillos, former state senator and assemblyman from the 13th district, Republican nominee for New Jersey's 6th congressional district in 1992, and Republican nominee for U.S. Senate in 2012
 Rik Mehta, pharmaceutical executive, attorney, and Republican nominee for U.S. Senate in 2020 (running for NJ-07 in 2022) (endorsed Jack Ciattarelli)
 Holly Schepisi, state assemblywoman (2012–2021) and senator (2021–present) from the 39th district (running for State Senate) (endorsed Jack Ciattarelli)

Fundraising

Endorsements

Lieutenant Governor nomination

Nominee
 Diane Allen, former state senator from the 7th district (1998–2018) and candidate for US Senate in 2002

Potential candidates not selected
 Holly Schepisi, state assemblywoman (2012–2021) and senator (2021–present) from the 39th district

On May 4, 2021, the New Jersey Globe published a list of nine potential candidates for Lieutenant Governor after speaking with "more than two dozen Republican leaders, strategists and activists." Diane Allen (who was selected as Republican gubernatorial nominee Jack Ciattarelli's running mate) was one of the names on this list. The others were:
 Kristin Corrado, state senator from the 40th district (2017–present), Chair of the New Jersey Senate Republican Conference (2019–present)
 Antony Ghee, candidate for New Jersey's 11th congressional district in 2018, hedge fund manager, and U.S. Army JAG captain
 Christine Hanlon, Monmouth County Clerk (2015–present)
 Barbara Kim-Hagemann, New Jersey VFW State Commander
 Nancy Munoz, state assemblywoman from the 21st district (2009–present)
 Laura Overdeck, businesswoman and philanthropist (founder and president of Bedtime Math and co-founder of the Women for a Stronger New Jersey Super-PAC)
 Ryan Peters, state assemblyman from the 8th district (2018–present) (will not be running for re-election to the State Assembly)
 Michele Siekerka, President & CEO of the New Jersey Business and Industry Association (2014–present) and former New Jersey Department of Environmental Protection Deputy Commissioner (2010–2014) in the Christie administration

Debates

A second debate on NJ PBS featuring Ciattarelli and Singh and moderated by NJ Spotlight News reporters Briana Vannozzi, Colleen O'Dea, and David Cruz was planned for May 26, 2021, but later cancelled on May 24, 2021, after Singh announced that he would decline to participate.

Polling

Results

General election
Five candidates appeared on the general election ballot, the lowest number of candidates for a New Jersey gubernatorial election since 1953, which also featured five.

Candidates
 Phil Murphy (Democratic), incumbent governor (2018–present)
 Running mate: Sheila Oliver, incumbent lieutenant governor (2018–present)
 Jack Ciattarelli (Republican), former state assemblyman from the 16th district (2011–2018) and candidate for governor in 2017
 Running mate: Diane Allen, former state senator from the 7th district (1998–2018)
 Running mate: Eveline Brownstein, activist and professor
 Madelyn R. Hoffman (Green), environmental activist, professor, and candidate for governor in 1997 and U.S. Senate in 2018 and 2020
 Running mate: Heather Warburton, activist and talk show host
 Joanne Kuniansky (Socialist Workers), retail worker
 Running mate: Vivian Sahner, militant author

Withdrew
 Ed Forchion (Legalize Marijuana), cannabis rights activist and perennial candidate
 Justin Maldonado 
 David Winkler

Fundraising

Debates
Although New Jersey State Law gives until September 1, 2021, for independent gubernatorial candidates to fundraise $490,000 to qualify for the debates, the invitees of the first debate were definitively stated at around July 20, 2021, which was over a month before the deadline. Despite the third-party candidates being ineligible to debate in any debates that were sponsored by the New Jersey Election Law Enforcement Commission, the New Jersey Globe held another debate for third-party Lieutenant Governor candidates on October 11, 2021.

Predictions

Endorsements

Polling

Aggregate polls

Graphical summary

Table

Phil Murphy vs. generic opponent

General election results

Results by county

Counties that flipped from Democratic to Republican
Atlantic (largest municipality: Egg Harbor Township)
Cumberland (largest municipality: Vineland)
Gloucester (largest municipality: Washington Township)

Results by congressional district
Murphy won 6 of 12 congressional districts. Ciattarelli, however, won the remaining 6, including four held by Democrats.

See also
 2021 United States gubernatorial elections
 2021 New Jersey State Senate election
 2021 New Jersey General Assembly election

Notes

References

External links
Official campaign websites
 Jack Ciattarelli (R) for Governor
 Madelyn Hoffman (G) for Governor
 Gregg Mele (L) for Governor 
 Phil Murphy (D) for Governor

2021
New Jersey
gubernatorial